De rebus bellicis ("On the Things of Wars") is an anonymous work of the 4th or 5th century which suggests remedies for the military and financial problems in the Roman Empire, including a number of fanciful war machines. It was written after the death of Constantine I in 337 (it is explicitly stated that Constantine was dead when the work was written) and before the fall of the Western Roman Empire in 476. Some researchers suggest that it may refer to the Battle of Adrianople of 378 (it refers to the serious threat posed by the barbarian tribes to the empire), or even the death of Emperor Theodosius I in 395, as it uses the plural form of the word "princeps", the title of the emperor, which may refer to the split of the Empire between Honorius and Arcadius after the death of Theodosius.

Editions
Anonymi Auctoris De Rebus Bellicis. recensvit Robert I. Ireland (Bibliotheca scriptorvm Graecorvm et Romanorvm Tevbneriana), Lipsiae, 1984.
 "Anónimo Sobre Asuntos Militares", Edited, trans. and comm. by Álvaro Sánchez–Ostiz (EUNSA), Pamplona, 2004.
 "Le cose della guerra", Introduction, Text, Translation and Commentary by Andrea Giardina, Fondazione Lorenzo Valla, Arnoldo Mondadori 1989.

Further reading
 O. Seeck, in RE I (1894), s.v. 'Anonymi n. 3', col. 2325.
 S. Reinach, "Un homme à projects du bas-empire", <<Revue archéologique>> XVI 1922, p. 205-265.
 Hartwin Brandt, Zeitkritik in der Spätantike. Untersuchungen zu den Reformvorschlägen des Anonymus De rebus bellicis (Munich 1988) (Vestigia 40).
 J. H. W. G. Liebeschuetz, "Realism and Phantasy: The Anonymous De Rebus Bellicis and its Afterlife," in Idem. Decline and Change in Late Antiquity: Religion, Barbarians and their Historiography (Aldershot, Ashgate, 2006) (Variorum Collected Studies).
 E. A. Thompson, A Roman Reformer and Inventor: Being a new Text of the Treatise De Rebus Bellicis with Translation and Introduction (Oxford 1952).
 S. Mazzarino, "Aspetti sociali del IV secolo. Ricerche di Storia tardo-romana" (Roma 1951; Milano 2002).

External links

 Anonymi Auctoris De rebus bellicis (full Latin text from Ireland's 1979 edition)

4th-century Latin books
5th-century Latin books
Latin military books
Military technology books
Roman military writers